Puthumbaka Venkatapathi served as the Member of the Legislative Assembly for Sattenapalli constituency in Andhra Pradesh, India, between 1985 and 1989. They represented the Communist Party of India (Marxist).

References

Andhra Pradesh MLAs 1985–1989
Communist Party of India (Marxist) politicians from Andhra Pradesh
People from Guntur district
Telugu politicians